All Costs Paid ( translit. Za vsyo zaplacheno) is a Soviet TV miniseries produced by Studio Ekran. The director Aleksei Saltykov well known for his film The Chairman ( translit. "Predsedatel") with Mikhail Ulyanov, an acclaimed Russian actor playing a main character. All Costs Paid is one of the first Soviet feature films that shows the war in Afghanistan. Film has unusually truthful point of view on that period of Soviet Era and on the Soviet–Afghan War.

Plot
After the war several Russian ex-soldiers went to Siberia to raise money for a memorial to their friends killed in Afghanistan.
For them the war had not ended.

Cast
 Vladimir Litvinov – Semyonov
 Aleksandr Barinov – Botsman
 Olegar Fedoro – Mafioso  Maradona
 Vladimir Nosik – Dusya
 Irina Senotova – Lilya
 Alim Kouliev – Urka
 Viktor Pavlov – Snegirev
 Lev Borisov – Maligin
 Aleksey Buldakov – Khramov
 Mikhail Gilevich – Alyes
 Valeriy Afanaseyev – Bogdanov
 Vladimir Timofeyev – Ruchiyov
 Raimondas Paskevicius – Rimondas
 Vera Ivleva – Mother

References

External links
 Trailer
 Cast (in russian)
 

Soviet war drama films
1980s Russian-language films
Studio Ekran films
Soviet–Afghan War films
Films directed by Alexey Saltykov